The Port of Maoming is a natural coastal seaport located on Maoming, Guangdong. It opens to the South China Sea.

In 2012, the port handled 23.9 million tonnes of total cargo and 83,543 TEU of containers.

Setting

History

Layout and Facilities

Shuidong Port Area is the original port area, set alongside the mouth of the Maoming lagoon. As of 2012, it had 2 liquid chemical berths of 30,000DWT, 2 general cargo berths of 10,000DWT and 9 multipurpose berths. The channel is 15m deep.

Bohe New Port Areais located on the Liantou Peninsula, to the southeast of the Shuidong area. Since 1994 it has operated a single buoy mooring for 300000DWT VLCC 850,000m3 tank storage. 10Mt annual capacity. Bohe fishing port, with 800m wharf is across the bay. Future plans are for an extensive artificial deep-water port built on reclaimed land on the Peninsula, for a total of 33 berths, of which 2 coal berths of 150,000DWT and 1 of 100,000DWT; 2 ore berths of 200,000DWT, 3 bulk cargo berths of 30,000DWT; 7 general cargo berths of 70,000DWT, 2 container berts of 100,000DWT, 12 liquid chemical berths of 50,000-100,000DWT, 2 LNG berths and 1 300,000DWT oil berth.

Jida Port Area is a planned development further east of the Bohe New Port, intended to support the planned harbor-front industrial development area. It is planned to have 47 deep-water berths. of which 6 100000DWT container berths.

Administration

Operations

References

External links

Ports and harbours of China